Porter is a town in Wagoner County, Oklahoma, United States. It promotes itself as "The Peach Capital of Oklahoma."  The population was 566 at the 2010 census, a loss of 1.4 percent, compared to 574 at the 2000 census.

Geography
Porter is located at  (35.867448, -95.521818).

Demographics

As of the census of 2000, there were 574 people, 229 households, and 160 families residing in the town. There were 253 housing units at an average density of 354.5 per square mile (137.6/km2). The racial makeup of the town was 81.36% White, 3.83% African American, 9.58% Native American, 0.35% from other races, and 4.88% from two or more races. Hispanic or Latino of any race were 1.05% of the population.

There were 229 households, out of which 34.5% had children under the age of 18 living with them, 51.1% were married couples living together, 15.3% had a female householder with no husband present, and 30.1% were non-families. 28.4% of all households were made up of individuals, and 13.1% had someone living alone who was 65 years of age or older. The average household size was 2.51 and the average family size was 3.09.

In the town, the population was spread out, with 31.5% under the age of 18, 8.2% from 18 to 24, 25.6% from 25 to 44, 20.7% from 45 to 64, and 13.9% who were 65 years of age or older. The median age was 34 years. For every 100 females, there were 90.7 males. For every 100 females age 18 and over, there were 81.1 males.

The median income for a household in the town was $21,012, and the median income for a family was $23,875. Males had a median income of $23,750 versus $16,875 for females. The per capita income for the town was $10,718. About 16.1% of families and 19.7% of the population were below the poverty line, including 20.7% of those under age 18 and 38.0% of those age 65 or over.

Education
Students are zoned to Porter Consolidated Schools.

References

Towns in Wagoner County, Oklahoma
Towns in Oklahoma